Helen Robinson may refer to:

 Helen Robinson (businesswoman) (born 1965), businesswoman and company director from New Zealand
 Helen M. Robinson (1906–1988), American author and educator
 Helen Ring Robinson (1878–1923), American suffragist, writer, and political office holder